Blake Thomas Worsley (born November 7, 1987 in Vancouver, British Columbia) is a Canadian Olympic swimmer. He competed for Canada at the 2009 World Aquatics Championships and the 2010 Commonwealth Games, where he finished 12th. He was raised in Steamboat Springs, Colorado and swam for the University of Denver.

Personal bests and records held
Long course (50 m)

Short course (25 m)

Short course (25 y)

References

1987 births
Canadian emigrants to the United States
Canadian male freestyle swimmers
Swimmers from Vancouver
University of Denver alumni
Living people
College men's swimmers in the United States
Swimmers at the 2012 Summer Olympics
Olympic swimmers of Canada
Swimmers at the 2010 Commonwealth Games
Commonwealth Games competitors for Canada